"Good Times Roll" is a song by American rock band the Cars released as the first track from their 1978 debut album The Cars. Written by Ric Ocasek as a sarcastic comment on rock's idea of good times, the song features layered harmonies courtesy of producer Roy Thomas Baker.

"Good Times Roll" was released as the third single from the album in 1979, charting at number 41 in the United States. It has since received positive critical reception and has appeared on many of the Cars' compilation albums.

Background
Written and sung by Cars lead vocalist and rhythm guitarist Ric Ocasek, "Good Times Roll" was released as the third single from the band's debut album. Ocasek wrote the song as a sarcastic commentary on the good times in rock music, saying, "That was my song about what the good times in rock 'n' roll really mean, instead of what they're supposed to be. It was kind of a parody of good times, really. It was kinda like not about good times at all."

"Good Times Roll," like the rest of the album, was produced by Roy Thomas Baker, who was responsible for the recording's layered harmonies. Ocasek recalled, "I just remember when we did 'Good Times Roll' in the studio in England on the first record, and we heard back the vocals. I told Roy that I thought it was way, way too much. ... But you know, it grew on me later and it sounded so smooth. It was a nice process to do it because Roy, you know, was fortunate enough to have a 40-track machine ... so he could do layering of vocals a lot."

The song begins with electronic drums and a guitar riff, soon joined by Ocasek's lead vocals and synthesizers by keyboardist Greg Hawkes. The song notably features the lyric "Let them brush your rock 'n' roll hair"; when asked if the line was a throwaway, Ocasek replied, "Not in my opinion. It's like 'let them do whatever they want to do.

Release
The song was released as the third and final single from The Cars in February 1979, backed with "All Mixed Up". It reached number 41 on the Billboard Hot 100 chart, performing slightly worse than its predecessors "Just What I Needed" and "My Best Friend's Girl".

Of the nine tracks on The Cars, "Good Times Roll" was the only song for which no demo recording could be found during the compilation of the 1999 The Cars: Deluxe Edition package. Instead, a live version of "Good Times Roll" is included alongside demo versions of the other eight tracks.

"Good Times Roll" has been featured on several Cars anthologies, including 1985's Greatest Hits, 1995's Just What I Needed: The Cars Anthology, and 2002's Complete Greatest Hits.

Reception
"Good Times Roll" has generally received positive reviews from critics. Greg Prato of AllMusic described the track as one of the "familiar hits" on The Cars and called it a highlight. Cash Box said it is "a distinctive and impressive track" with "broad chorus and staccato rhythms." The Billboard review of The Cars noted "Good Times Roll" as one of the best cuts, while Jaime Welton, author of 1001 Albums You Must Hear Before You Die, described the track as a "new wave gem". Rolling Stone named the song one of Ocasek's "essential songs", praising the "hard-edged midtempo strut, blaring backing vocals, and Ocaseks stylized singing" in the song. Ultimate Classic Rock named the song the fifth best Cars song, calling it "one of the best side ones, track ones ever." The song was also ranked among the band and Ric Ocasek's best by the New York Times, Esquire, and Inquisitr. Billboard Magazine felt that the "moody sound" provided a "nice cynical twist" on the good time lyrics.

Other appearances
"Good Times Roll" has used in the soundtracks of several films, including 2003's Wonderland, 2005's Just Like Heaven and 2016's Everybody Wants Some!!.

Personnel 

 Ric Ocasek – lead vocals, rhythm guitar
 Elliot Easton – lead guitar, backing vocals
 Benjamin Orr – backing vocals, bass guitar
 David Robinson – drums, percussion, Syndrums, backing vocals
 Greg Hawkes – keyboards, backing vocals

Charts

References

1978 songs
1979 singles
Elektra Records singles
Songs written by Ric Ocasek
Song recordings produced by Roy Thomas Baker
The Cars songs